Whiteman, Western Australia is a suburb in the north eastern part of the Perth, metropolitan area in Western Australia.

It is the location of Whiteman Park, which also includes the Caversham Wildlife Park.

Notes

 
Suburbs of Perth, Western Australia
Suburbs and localities in the City of Swan